BriTANicK  is an internet sketch comedy duo from Atlanta, Georgia, that consists of Brian McElhaney and Nick Kocher. McElhaney graduated from the Atlanta International School and Kocher graduated from The Paideia School. They attended New York University together. The duo's videos have been featured on internet video sites including YouTube, CollegeHumor, Cracked, Break, and FunnyOrDie. BriTANicK was nominated by the ECNY Awards as Best Sketch Comedy Group in New York in 2008 and by Comedy Central's inaugural Comedy Awards for best web video. In 2012, BriTANicK appeared in Joss Whedon's 2012 adaptation of Much Ado About Nothing.

History
Both members of the duo started performing and creating videos while they were students at New York University. They started officially performing as BriTANicK in 2008, when they opened for Robin Williams at the SF Sketchfest. Since then, they have continued to create internet sketches, as well as performing around the country. They have performed three shows at the Upright Citizens Brigade Theatre in New York: "Begging for Approval", "The Infinity Prison", and their current monthly live show "The Monthly Mankerthon". Kocher and McElhaney perform sketch regularly at UCB as well as stand-up and improv comedy around New York City.

In 2016, Kocher and McElhaney were hired as writers by NBC's Saturday Night Live.

Internet sketches
BriTANicK were one of the only featured sketch comedy groups on both Cracked.com and CollegeHumor, where they were featured regularly.. Their sketch "Pillow Talk" features Private Practice's Chris Lowell. They have also been featured as "Kings of DotComedy" on G4's Attack of the Show!.

In the spring of 2020, the duo directed three episodes of Making Fun with Akilah and Milana for Comedy Central digital.

Reviews, awards and festivals
BriTANicK has been reviewed in the Charleston City Paper and Time Out Chicago, and was named a Time Out New York "Don't Miss" critic's pick in 2009.

The duo has performed in SF Sketchfest, NYC Sketchfest, Chicago Sketchfest, and Piccolo Spoleto in Spoleto Festival USA. In 2008 they won the Seattle Sketchfest Video Contest and NY Comedy Festival's "Web Video Cram-Off". Their sketch, "Academy Award Winning Movie", resulted in coverage on the websites of the Huffington Post and Time magazine as well as praise from Roger Ebert, Joss Whedon, Stephen Fry, and Ashton Kutcher. They were nominated for The Comedy Awards' "Best Viral Original" and the ECNY Awards' "Best Comedic Video".

In 2022 they performed at the Edinburgh Festival Fringe.

Filmography
Searching for Sonny (2011) as Calvin Knight and Gary Noble
Much Ado About Nothing (2013) as First and Second Watchman
Balls Out (2014) as Grant and Chance
How I Met Your Mother (2014) in the episode "Sunrise".
The Amazing Spider-Man 2 (2014) as television eyewitness

References

External links
 
 
 
 
 

American comedy troupes
New York University alumni
American comedy duos
People from Atlanta
American Internet celebrities
Year of birth missing (living people)
Living people